Yuri Gareginyan (born 3 February 1994) is an Armenian footballer who plays as a midfielder who plays for Pyunik and the Armenia national team.

Career
Gareginyan made his international debut for Armenia on 11 October 2020 in the UEFA Nations League, coming on as a 67th-minute substitute in the 2–2 draw at home against Georgia.

Career statistics

International

Honours
Pyunik
 Armenian Premier League: 2021–22

References

External links
 
 
 

1994 births
Living people
Footballers from Yerevan
Armenian footballers
Armenia international footballers
Association football midfielders
FC Ararat Yerevan players
FC Noah players
Armenian Premier League players
Armenian First League players